S76 may refer to:
 S76 (Long Island bus)
 S76 (New York City bus) serving Staten Island
 Brooks Seaplane Base, in Kootenai County, Idaho, United States
 Daihatsu Hijet (S76), a Japanese van
 Fiat S76 Record, a land speed record vehicle
 Sikorsky S-76, an American helicopter